Charles Henry Pearson (7 September 1830 – 29 May 1894) was a British-born Australian historian, educationist, politician and journalist. According to John Tregenza, "Pearson was the outstanding intellectual of the Australian colonies. A democrat by conviction, he combined a Puritan determination in carrying reforms with a gentle manner and a scrupulous respect for the traditional rules and courtesies of public debate."

Early life

Pearson was born at Islington, London, fourth son (and tenth child) of the Rev. John Norman Pearson, M.A., then principal of the Church Missionary College, Islington, and Harriet née Puller.  
He was a younger brother of Sir John Pearson, QC.

Pearson spent his early childhood in Islington and Tunbridge Wells and was home educated until he went to Rugby School at the age of 13, where at first did well. Later on, coming into conflict with one of the masters, he was withdrawn by his father and sent first to a private tutor and then to King's College London, where he came under the influence of John Sherren Brewer and Frederick Denison Maurice. In 1849, he matriculated at Oriel College, Oxford. Not enjoying teaching, he devoted most of his energy to the Oxford Union, of which he was elected president in 1852–53, and was associated with some of the most distinguished men of his period. Pearson began to study medicine but, two years later, had a serious attack of pleurisy while on holiday in Ireland and so discontinued his studies because medical life was considered arduous.

Academic career
In 1855, Pearson became lecturer in English language and literature at King's College, London, and shortly afterward was given the professorship in modern history. The salary was not large, and Pearson did a good deal of writing for the Saturday Review, the Spectator, and other London weekly reviews. In 1862, he was editor of the National Review for a year. He travelled in Russia in 1858 and in 1863 spent some time in Poland. In 1864, as a result of ill health and depressed by his failure to be appointed Oxford University's inaugural Chichele Professor of Modern History and his low salary at King's College, he took a year off in South Australia. He attempted to establish a 640 acres (259 ha) sheep station near Mount Remarkable but was beaten by severe drought and returned to England.

Pearson continued working on his History of England during the Early and Middle Ages, an able work begun in 1861 and published in 1868. During a trip to the United States, in contrast with the earlier views of Charles Dickens and others, he found "the well-bred American is generally pleasanter than a well-bred Englishman.... I agree in an observation made to me by an Englishman that the American's great advantage over the Englishman is his greater modesty." On his return, he devoted himself to what he regarded "as the best piece of historical work I have done, my maps of England in the first 13 centuries." It was eventually published in 1870.

In 1869, he became lecturer on modern history at Trinity College, Cambridge, but found the work unsatisfactory:

His father had died some years before and he lost his mother in February 1871. Shortly afterwards, partly as a result of eyestrain and a lack of good students, he decided to return to Australia and combine a light literary life with farming. He arrived in South Australia in December 1871.

Move to Australia
Pearson enjoyed the next three years on his farm at Haverhill, revelled in the hot, dry conditions, which suited his constitution, and hoped to obtain a professorship in the new University of Adelaide. He married in December 1872 Edith Lucille, daughter of Philip Butler of Tickford Abbey, Buckinghamshire, and cousin of Sir Richard Butler; unfortunately, her health gave way and she became very ill and, greatly to their regret, they had to give up their bush home. Pearson then accepted a position as lecturer in history at the University of Melbourne. His salary was not high, and he decided to augment it by writing for the press. The Argus rejected his articles as being too radical, but The Age began to accept them, and he became a valued contributor.  The university did not allow him to pick his own textbooks or plan his courses. On 4 June 1874, and he created a university debating club, which recruited Alexander Sutherland, Alfred Deakin, William Shiels, H. B. Higgins and Theodore Fink.

Pearson found, however, that his position at the university was not satisfactory and decided to accept the position of headmaster of the newly
-formed Presbyterian Ladies' College at a much-increased salary. He was greatly interested in his new work, but after two and a half years, from 1875 to 1877, a section of the governing body objected to his views on the land question. He had advocated a progressive land tax in a public lecture and thus incurred the wrath of the moneyed interests, which all that supported the school, and Pearson decided to resign.

Political career
The newly-founded National Reform and Protection League of the period felt that here might be a valuable recruit and pressed Pearson to stand for parliament. He was afraid that his health would not stand the strain but accepted nomination for the difficult seat of Boroondara and was narrowly defeated. In May 1877, the Graham Berry government commissioned him to inquire into the state of education in the colony and the means of improving it. The report for which he received a fee of £1000 was completed in 1878. It was a valuable document, especially as he was the first to advocate the establishing of high schools to make a ladder for able children from the primary schools to university. This found little favour at the time, and more than 30 years passed before that part of his scheme was fully developed. Another valuable part of the report dealt with technical education and foreshadowed the many technical schools since established in the state of Victoria.

On 7 June 1878, Pearson was returned as one of the members for Castlemaine in the Victorian Legislative Assembly and thus began his political career. Almost immediately, he was plunged into the quarrel between the Assembly and the Legislative Council that had arisen over Premier Berry's appropriation bill. The government determined to try to obtain the consent of the home authorities to the limiting of the rights of the Council. In December 1878, Pearson was appointed a commissioner to proceed to London with the Berry bill. The mission was not successful, the feeling being in that it was the business of both houses to settle questions of this kind themselves. On 3 August 1880, Pearson became minister without salary or portfolio. On 4 July 1881, he declined the offer of Agent-General in London, and as he believed that the administration was doomed, and on 9 July, the cabinet resigned.

Pearson was elected to the district of East Bourke Boroughs in 1883 and held it until April 1892.

Pearson remained a private member until 18 February 1886 when he became minister of public instruction in the Gillies-Deakin coalition ministry, and in 1889 succeeded in passing an education act, which introduced important changes, but did not proceed far in the direction of technical education. However,it introduced the kindergarten system and 200 scholarships of £10 to £40 a year to help clever boys and girls to proceed from the primary schools to the grammar schools. He was able to implement one of the recommendations of his 1878 report, the building of a teachers college near the university. In November 1890 the Gillies-Deakin government resigned, and Pearson again became a private member. He took some interest in federation but, realizing its difficulties, adopted a cautious attitude.

Retirement from politics
Pearson retired from parliament in April 1892, declining to stand for election again, and began to work seriously on his book, National Life and Character: a Forecast. His indifferent health may have been one of the reasons preventing him from being offered the agent-generalship. Like everyone else, he had suffered heavy losses from the land boom and its aftereffects, and in August 1892 he left for England and accepted the secretaryship to the agent-general for Victoria. He worked hard and successfully, but though he did not complain, it must have been a great shock to him when he received a cablegram to say he was to be compulsorily retired in June. He caught a chill in February, which settled on his lungs, and died in May 1894, leaving a widow and three daughters. Mrs Pearson was given a civil list pension of £100 a year in 1895.

He is buried on the east side of the western path in Brompton Cemetery in London, midway between the north entrance and the central buildings.

National Life and Character: a Forecast
Pearson's book, National Life and Character: a Forecast, had been published at the beginning of 1893, and created an international sensation. Theodore Roosevelt wrote to Pearson to praise the book; Prime Minister William Ewart Gladstone recommended it highly, and the late nineteenth century English novelist George Gissing read it in January 1896.

Pearson's book caused a shock because it challenged the conventional wisdom about Western expansion, progress and triumph. Pearson argued that the "Black and Yellow" races were in the ascendant, as they were powered by population increase and, in the case of the Chinese, industrial capacity. He argued the so-called higher races, under the impact of declining birth rates and state socialism, had become "stationary." Colonized and otherwise subordinated peoples would soon escape relations of 'tutelage' and become self-governing states active on the world stage. Pearson was a prophet of decolonization and was immediately seen as such, with great attention paid to his theme of the white man under siege.

The argument strongly reinforced demands for a White Australia policy.

In August 1902 Prime Minister Edmund Barton, spoke in parliament in support of the White Australia policy; he quoted Pearson's disturbing forecast:
"The day will come, and perhaps is not far distant, when the European observer will look round to see the globe girdled with a continuous zone of the black and yellow races, no longer too weak for aggression or under tutelage, but independent, or practically so, in government, monopolising the trade of their own regions, and circumscribing the industry of the Europeans; when Chinamen and the natives of Hindostan, the states of Central and South America, by that time predominantly Indian . . . are represented by fleets in the European seas, invited to international conferences and welcomed as allies in quarrels of the civilized world. The citizens of these countries will then be taken up into the social relations of the white races, will throng the English turf or the salons of Paris, and [End Page 43] will be admitted to inter-marriage. It is idle to say that if all this should come to pass our pride of place will not be humiliated.... We shall wake to find ourselves elbowed and hustled, and perhaps even thrust aside by peoples whom we looked down upon as servile and thought of as bound always to minister to our needs. The solitary consolation will be that the changes have been inevitable."

Other writings
Pearson also wrote Russia by a recent traveller (1859), Insurrection in Poland (1863), The Canoness: a Tale in Verse (1871), History of England in the Fourteenth Century (1876), Biographical Sketch of Henry John Stephen Smith (1894). A selection from his miscellaneous writings, Reviews and Critical Essays, was published in 1896, with an interesting memoir by his friend, Professor Herbert Strong.

Assessment
"Pearson had a remarkable memory and a good knowledge of classic and modern European languages; he read Ibsen and Gogol in their original tongues. Slightly built, he had the appearance of a scholar, but being shy he found it difficult to be superficially genial. He was kind with his friends and had an excellent sense of humour. Of his honesty it has been said "he was one of the small class of persons whose practical adhesion to their convictions is only made more resolute by its colliding with popular sentiment or with self-interest". His health was always uncertain, probably his sojourn in Australia prolonged his life. But the debt he owed Australia was more than repaid by the public services he rendered."

Sources
 Marilyn Lake, "The White Man under Siege: New Histories of Race in the Nineteenth Century and the Advent of White Australia," History Workshop Journal 58 (2004) 41–62  in Project Muse
 John Tregenza, Professor of Democracy: the Life of Charles Henry Pearson 1830–1894, Oxford Don and Australian Radical, Melbourne, 1968
 Charles H. Pearson, Reviews and Critical Essays, ed. Herbert Augustus Strong, London, 1896 full text online
 Charles H. Pearson,  History of England During the Early and Middle Ages (1876) text online

References

External links
 
 
Pearson books online

 
 

1830 births
1894 deaths
People educated at Rugby School
Alumni of King's College London
Alumni of Oriel College, Oxford
Presidents of the Oxford Union
Academics of King's College London
19th-century Australian politicians
Victoria (Australia) state politicians
Members of the Victorian Legislative Assembly
English non-fiction writers
English male non-fiction writers
RMIT University people
19th-century Australian historians